Juliet Lyons is an American singer, songwriter, and production music composer. Her music ranges from Pop to New Age.  She is best known as the featured vocalist in the Cinderella trailer and for her cover of Billy Idol’s “White Wedding,” in the ABC Family television show Pretty Little Liars.

Early life 
Juliet Lyons was born in Stanford, CA and grew up in Albuquerque, NM. She graduated from UMKC Conservatory of Music and earned a Bachelor for Music - Vocal Performance and a Bachelor of Music Education.

Career 
Lyons has written, produced, and performed music which has been licensed in over 150 studio films, network television series, and trailers. Notable productions include films like Cinderella, Ghost In the Shell and television show Pretty Little Liars. Her 2019 record release, The Light Within: Songs for Yoga, Healing, & Inner Peace debuted at number 3 on the Billboard New Age albums Chart.

Music awards and nominations 
Lyons has been nominated twice for the Independent Music Awards, and eleven times for Hollywood Music in Media Awards.  She won a Hollywood Music in Media Award in 2019 for her song, “Eternal Now” ft. Ron Korb.

References

External links 

American women singer-songwriters
21st-century American singers
Living people
American singer-songwriters
21st-century American women singers
Year of birth missing (living people)